Arve Berg (born 1 May 1935, in Skodje) is a Norwegian politician for the Labour Party.

He was elected to the Norwegian Parliament from Møre og Romsdal in 1973, and was re-elected on three occasions, serving until 1989.

On the local level he was a member of Ålesund city council from 1963 to 1975. From 1971 to 1975, he was also a deputy member of Møre og Romsdal county council. He chaired the local party chapter from 1966 to 1968.

References

1935 births
Living people
Members of the Storting
Møre og Romsdal politicians
Labour Party (Norway) politicians
Politicians from Ålesund
20th-century Norwegian politicians